George Alexander Hamilton (29 August 1802 – 17 September 1871) was a minor British Conservative Party politician and later a prominent civil servant. He was an extremely zealous and active Protestant and a supporter of the Orange Order.

Political career 
Hamilton was seated as a member of parliament (MP) for Dublin City on 13 April 1835, after a successful election petition. He represented this constituency until he was defeated in the general election of 1837. Hamilton was subsequently elected one of the MPs for Dublin University at a by-election on 10 February 1843 and continued to represent the seat until he resigned in January 1859.

He occupied the political post of Financial Secretary to the Treasury in the first (from 2 March 1852 until 17 December 1852) and second ministries of the Earl of Derby (2 March 1858 to January 1859). Hamilton was appointed Assistant Secretary to the Treasury in 1859 and Permanent Secretary to the Treasury in 1867. These were the most senior civil service posts in the Treasury at that time, and Hamilton continued to serve until 1870. He was made a member of the Privy Council of Ireland on 7 August 1869.

Background 

Hamilton was born at Tyrella, Downpatrick, County Down, on 29 August 1802. He was the elder son of the Rev. George Hamilton of Hampton Hall, Balbriggan, County Dublin, who died in March 1833 (first cousin of George Hamilton, the Canadian lumber baron), by Anna, daughter of Thomas Pepper of Ballygarth Castle, County Meath. His grandfather, George Hamilton (d. 1793), who was a Baron of the Court of Exchequer (Ireland) from 1776 to 1793, was a younger brother of Hugh Hamilton, Bishop of Ossory. Hugh's descendants included C.S. Lewis.

He was sent to Rugby School in 1814, and matriculated from Trinity College, Oxford, on 15 December 1818, took his B.A. degree in 1821, and was created D.C.L. on 9 June 1853.

MP and civil servant 

Soon after leaving the university he settled on the paternal estate and began to take a part in public political meetings in Dublin. At the general election in 1826 he became a candidate for the representation of that city, but after a severe and expensive contest lasting fourteen days was defeated by a small majority. In 1830 and 1832 he again unsuccessfully contested the seat for Dublin. At the close of another election for Dublin in January 1835 the numbers were: O'Connell 2,678, Ruthven 2,630, Hamilton 2,461, West 2,455. A petition was, however, presented; the commissioners sat from 3 May 1835 to 6 January 1836, and from 29 Feb to 26 May, when Hamilton and West were declared duly elected. In the following year, 1837, he again contested Dublin unsuccessfully, and although in presenting a petition he was supported by ‘the Protestants of England,’ and a sum of money known as the Spottiswoode subscription was raised to assist him in paying his expenses, O'Connell on this occasion retained his seat. Throughout his career, he took the side of the Orangemen, and was a prominent figure in the Protestant demonstrations. On the formation of the ‘Lay Association for the Protection of Church Property’ in August 1834, he became the honorary secretary of the association, and for a long period worked energetically in the cause. In parliament he was chiefly known as having presented the petition of the celebrated Protestant meeting of 14 January 1837, which gave rise to much discussion and subsequently to the Earl of Roden's committee of inquiry. On 10 February 1843, on the occurrence of a chance vacancy, he was returned by the University of Dublin, which constituency he represented without intermission until February 1859. To him was mainly due the formation of the Conservative Society for Ireland, which formed the rallying point for the conservative party after the passing of the Reform Bill. On 2 June 1845 he spoke on the subject of the 'godless college bill', as the measure which became the Queen's Colleges (Ireland) Act 1845 was popularly known, due to the fact that the three colleges it created could not give instruction in theology. Another speech of 21 August 1848 was printed with the title of 'Education in Ireland. Report of Speech in the House of Commons on Mr. Hamilton's motion on above subject,' 1848. On 21 June 1849 his proposal for an alteration in education in Ireland so as to make it acceptable to the Protestant clergy was lost by 162 to 102 votes. He held the financial secretaryship of the treasury under Lord Derby's administration from March to December 1852, and again on the return of the conservatives to power from March 1858 to January 1859. At this latter date, he was appointed Permanent Secretary of the Treasury. He was sworn a member of the Privy Council of the United Kingdom on 7 August 1869, and in the following year was named one of the Commissioners of the Church Temporalities in Ireland. He was a magistrate and Deputy-Lieutenant for Dublin County, and an LL.D. of Dublin University.

Private life 

In his role as a local landowner and MP, he was, like his father and grandfather, very active in the commercial development of the town of Balbriggan, expanding the harbour facilities and encouraging the development of the local hosiery manufactory. He was chairman of the company that built the Great Northern Railway from Dublin to Belfast. A keen antiquarian, he conducted rescue archaeology on a major passage grave discovered at Gormanston, County Meath, in the course of the building of the railway and wrote reports on this and other archaeological discoveries in the proceedings of the Royal Dublin Society. During the Great Irish famine he chaired the Relief Committee in the Balrothery Union of parishes which provided soup, bread and meal to the starving throughout the North Fingal area.

Death 

He died in Kingstown (now Dún Laoghaire), Ireland, on 17 September 1871 and was buried in St George's church, Balbriggan. Despite his lifelong advocacy of unionism, the last few miles of the journey to his burial were lined by thousands of grieving Roman Catholics and he received a laudatory obituary in the Nationalist Freeman's Journal.

Family 

His wife, whom he married on 1 May 1835, was Amelia Fancourt, daughter of Joshua Uhthoff of Bath, Somerset, England. His father-in-law (whose family were originally from Bremen) had a distinguished career in the Colonial Civil Service, and became Deputy British Resident at Poona. Hamilton was a cousin of the colonial judge John Walpole Willis.

References 
 " Paul Boyer, Clifford Clark Jr., Joseph Kett, Neal Salisbury, Harvard Sitkoff. The Enduring Vision: A History of the American People. Sixth Edition. Boston, New York: Houghton Mifflin Company, 2009"
 
 Parliamentary Election Results in Ireland, 1801–1922 edited by B.M. Walker (Royal Irish Academy 1978);
 British Historical Facts 1830–1900 by Chris Cook and Brendan Keith (Macmillan 1975);
 Who's Who of British members of parliament, Volume I 1832–1885 edited by M. Stenton (The Harvester Press 1976);
 I Like a Clamour, Max Bonnell (Federation Press, 2017).

Attribution

External links 
 

Irish Conservative Party MPs
UK MPs 1835–1837
UK MPs 1841–1847
UK MPs 1847–1852
UK MPs 1852–1857
UK MPs 1857–1859
Members of the Parliament of the United Kingdom for Dublin University
Permanent Secretaries of HM Treasury
Members of the Privy Council of the United Kingdom
Members of the Privy Council of Ireland
Members of the Parliament of the United Kingdom for County Dublin constituencies (1801–1922)
People from Downpatrick
People from Balbriggan
Alumni of Trinity College, Oxford
1802 births
1871 deaths